The North West Football Union (NWFU) was an Australian rules football competition which ran from 1910 to 1986. In its time it was one of the three main leagues in Tasmania, with the Tasmanian Football League and Northern Tasmanian Football Association representing the rest of the state. Burnie, Latrobe and Ulverstone were the most successful clubs with 12 premierships each.

The league disbanded after the 1986 season after major clubs such as Cooee and Devonport defected to the TFL Statewide League. In 1987 the NWFU effectively merged with the Northern Tasmanian Football Association (NTFA) to form the Northern Tasmanian Football League, which exists today as the North West Football League.

NWFU premierships

Winners by year

Reforming after the war there were two divisions, East and West, Both Divisional premiers would play off.

Most premierships

Tasmanian State Premiership

This was contested regularly between the premiers of the Tasmanian Football League and the Northern Tasmanian Football Association and then the NWFU from 1954 until 1978.

The six winners from the NWFU were - 
 1955 - Ulverstone
 1963 - Burnie
 1964 - Cooee
 1970 - Latrobe
 1976 - Ulverstone
 1978 - Cooee

Best and Fairests
The Wander Medal was awarded annually to the best and fairest player in the NWFU, every year from 1948 to 1986. Prior to 1948, the league's best and fairest award was known under various names and given out semi regularly. From 1945 to 1947, an award was given to best and fairest player from the western region but the name of it is unknown. Len Hayes won it in the first two years and Alan Crawford the last.

Wander Medal

 1948 - Dave Jeffrey
 1949 - Len Hayes
 1950 - Lou Redman
 1951 - Jack Rough
 1952 - Max Berryman, Peter Gillam
 1953 - Darrel Eaton
 1954 - Ray Stokes
 1955 - Arthur Hodgson
 1956 - Joe Murphy
 1957 - Darrel Baldock
 1958 - Colin Moore
 1959 - Darrel Baldock
 1960 - Terry Pierce

 1961 - Lloyd Robson
 1962 - Jock O'Brien
 1963 - John Bingley
 1964 - Wally Clark
 1965 - Len Lawson
 1966 - Bob Hickman
 1967 - Bob Hickman
 1968 - Brian Waters
 1969 - Darrel Baldock
 1970 - John Jillard
 1971 - John Jillard
 1972 - Ricky Smith
 1973 - Graeme Shephard

 1974 - Cec Rheinberger
 1975 - Ricky Watt
 1976 - Kerry Coates
 1977 - Ricky Smith
 1978 - Jim Prentice
 1979 - Tom Lee
 1980 - Lindsay Bell
 1981 - John Murphy
 1982 - Richard Lynch
 1983 - Stephen Parsons
 1984 - John Korporshoek
 1985 - Neville Muir
 1986 - Peter Borlini

Cheel Medal
 1923 - Stan Trebilco
 1924 - Fred Odgers
 1925 - Bill Berryman
 1926 - Rupert Stott
 1927 - H. O. "Nip" Smith (Penguin) 	
 1928 - Charlie Hallam
 1929 - Tas Langmaid
Royal Medal 
Awarded only to players from the eastern region of the NWFU
 1930 - Bill Berryman	 
Wright Medal 
Awarded only to players from the western region of the NWFU
 1930 - Jimmy Brown (Ulverstone)
 1931 - Gerry Plapp
Alford Medal
 1937 - Clem Riggs

References
Full Points Footy: NWFU Summary Chart 1910 to 1986

Defunct Australian rules football competitions in Tasmania